Arturo Molina Gutiérrez is a Mexican scientist, researcher and academic.

Biography 
Arturo Molina was born in Oaxaca, Oaxaca in 1964, he is the son of Dr. Arturo Molina Sosa. He is a Computer Systems Engineer and a Master of Computer Science from the Tec de Monterrey, Monterrey Campus. He holds a PhD in Mechanics from the Budapest University of Technology and Economics and a PhD in Manufacturing Systems from Loughborough University in England. He is currently Director of the Institute of Advanced Materials for Sustainable Manufacturing at the Tecnológico de Monterrey.

Academy 
Arturo Molina is a professor of the Doctorate in Engineering Sciences at the Monterrey Institute of Technology and Higher Education. He was visiting professor and researcher in mechanical engineering at the University of California, Berkeley, sponsored by the UC MEXUS CONACYT from 2003 to 2004. Since 2013 he has maintained a course within the Coursera platform where he teaches the subject of Rapid development of innovative products for emerging markets; From there and over the years, it has contributed to the training of more than 55,000 students from more than 118 different countries.

Scientific research 
His research areas include concurrent engineering, information models for design and manufacturing, technology modeling and integration in manufacturing, and technologies for collaborative engineering.

Contributions 
He participated in the “Marco 6” (Framework 6) project in Europe with the creation of ECOLEAD - European Collaborative networked Organizations LEADership. He is currently working on the “Marco 7” (Framework 7) project in Europe related to sustainable mass customization. He is also involved in the CREATIVA PYME project in Peru to support small and medium-sized enterprises financed by the IBM Shared University Research (SUR) program and the ICT-BUS of the Inter-American Development Bank (BID).

Consultancy 
Molina has worked as a consultant to the World Bank and the Inter-American Development Bank. He is a member of the United Nations Information and Communication Technologies Task Force, and part of the International Federation of Automatic Control. Molina has also been part of the editorial committees of the Annals of Review of Control magazine, virtual organizations and the International Journal of Computer Integrated Manufacturing. In 2012, he was a speaker in the Mexican Senate where he raised issues regarding the Energy Reform (Mexico). Since 2014 is part of the Nuevo León Energy Use Council.

He participates in international research networks, is Co-Chair in the Climate Change Global Challenge Group of the Worldwide Universities Network (WUN), is Chair of the Researcher Leader Group Engagement of Universitas 21 (U21), is Chair of the International Federation for Information Processing (IFIP). ) WG 5.12 Architectures for Enterprise Integration.

Business field 
He has started three technology-based companies. IECOS- Integration Engineering and Construction Systems (http://www.iecos.com), SMES- Solutions for Manufacturing Enterprise Systems and ALBIOMAR.

Awards and Recognitions 
Molina's work has been recognized with level III affiliation in the National System of Researchers (SNI). Recognitions for his research distinctions include:

 1999, Rómulo Garza Award, in the category of publications.
 1999, ARIS Award, for his research in the area of Business Modeling.
 2004, IBM Sur Grant Prize for her research Creative SME (PyME).
 2012, He was awarded by the Government of Hungary with the "Award of the Order of Merit of the Republic of Hungary"
 2015, Rómulo Garza Award, with the Recognition for Scientific Articles in High Impact Factor Indexed Magazines, with the text “Collaborative networked organizations - Concepts and practice in manufacturing enterprises” in co-authorship with Nathalíe María Galeano Sánchez.

Affiliations 

 He is a member of the Mexican Academy of Computing
 He is a member of the Mexican Academy of Sciences.
 He is a member of the Mexican Academy of Engineering.
 He is a member of the International Federation of Information Processing.
 He is a member of the International Federation of Automation and Control.
 He is a member of the Working Group on Enterprise Integration Architectures.
 He is a member of the Working Group on Cooperation Infrastructure for Virtual Enterprise and Electronic Business.
 He is a member of the Editorial Committee of the journal: International Journal of Mechanical Production Systems Engineering, ENIM, France;
 He is a member of the Editorial Committee of the journal: International Journal of Computer Integrated Manufacturing, IJCIM, England;
 He is a member of the journal Editorial Committee: International Journal of Networking and Virtual Organizations, England
 He is a member of the Editorial Committee of the journal: IFAC Reviews of Control, USA.9.

Council 

 He is a member of the INEEL Council (National Institute of Electricity and Clean Energies)
 He is a member of the Nestlé Mexico Shared Value Creation Council.
 He is a member of the COURSERA Academic Board

Technological perspective 
For Arturo Molina, technological development must be adapted to the needs of each country. The scientific research approach must solve a problem using theoretical and practical knowledge. The human and material resources must be identified in each country by the researchers, he presents that Mexican researchers must be part of the identification of the priority areas of the countries.

Publications 
He has published 16 books, over 150 peer-reviewed articles, 58 book chapters and over 60 articles for conferences.

 Francisco J Lozano, Alberto Mendoza, Arturo Molina (2022). "Energy Issues and Transition to a Low Carbon Economy" Editorial Springer XIV 307p, 
 Arturo Molina, Pedro Ponce, Jhonattan Miranda, Daniel Cortés (2021). "Enabling Systems for Intelligent Manufacturing in Industry 4.0" Editorial Springer 376p, eBook , 
 Pedro Ponce, Arturo Molina, Ricardo Ramírez, Efraín Méndez, Alexandro Ortíz, David Balderas (2020). "A practical approach to Metaheuristics using Labview and Matlab" Editorial CRC Press, 186p.,  
 David C. Balderas Silva, Pedro Ponce, Arturo Molina, Arturo Soriano (2020). "Applications of Human-Computer Interaction and Robotics based on Artificial Intelligence" Editorial Digital del Tecnológico de Monterrey (En Línea) 
 Pedro Ponce, Arturo Molina, Omar Mata, Luis Ibarra, Bryan MacCleery (2018). "Power System Fundamentals", Ediciones CRC Press, 429p., 1a Edición, United States.  (Print)
 Pedro Ponce, Kenneth Polasko, Arturo Molina, Miguel Ramírez, Patricia Mora (2016). "Intellectual Property Basic Manual for Researchers in Universities" Ediciones Bentham e-book  176p., 1a Edición, Emiratos Arabes Unidos. 
 Pedro Ponce, Arturo Molina, Brian MacCleery (2016). "Fuzzy Logic Type 1 and Type 2 Based on LabVIEW FPGA", Ediciones Springer, 233p., 1a Edición, Suiza.  (Print)
 Hiram Ponce-Espinosa, Pedro Ponce, Arturo Molina. (2014). "Artificial Organic Networks Artificial Intelligence Based on Carbon Networks, Studies in Computational Intelligence", Volume 521,  2014, 
 Pedro Ponce, Arturo Molina (2014). "LabVIEW Interactive for Everyone", Editorial Digital-Tecnológico de Monterrey,. 1a Edición,  (Online)
 Pedro Ponce, Arturo Molina, Paul Cepeda, Esther Lugo, Brian MacCleery. (2014). "Greenhouse Design and Control". Ediciones CRC Press., 1a Edición,  (Print)
 Hiram Ponce-Espinosa, Pedro Ponce, Molina, A. (2011). Fundamentos de LabVIEW, Alfaomega, 
 Molina, A.; Aguirre, J.M. and Sanchez,  D. (2008). “Perspectivas de Desarrollo Regional a través de Tecnología – Opciones para los Estados Mexicanos”, .
 Riba, C. y Molina, A. (2006). “Ingeniería Concurrente – Una Metodología Integradora”, Ediciones UPC, 314p., 1a. Edición, España. . [In English: “Concurrent Engineering – A Integration Methodology].
 Molina, A.; Sanchez J.M. and Kusiak, A. (1999). “Handbook of Life Cycle Engineering: Concepts, Models and Technologies”, Kluwer Academic Press, USA, p.640

Publications with more citations (2015-2020) 

 Enterprise engineering and management at the crossroads

P Bernus, T Goranson, J Gøtze, A Jensen-Waud, H Kandjani, A Molina, ...

Computers in Industry 79, 87-102, 2016

 Challenges and current developments for sensing, smart and sustainable enterprise systems

G Weichhart, A Molina, D Chen, LE Whitman, F Vernadat

Computers in Industry 79, 34-46, 2016

 End user perceptions toward smart grid technology: Acceptance, adoption, risks, and trust

P Ponce, K Polasko, A Molina

Renewable and Sustainable Energy Reviews 60, 587-598, 2016

 Design based on fuzzy signal detection theory for a semi-autonomous assisting robot in children autism therapy

P Ponce, A Molina, D Grammatiko

Computers in Human Behavior 55, 28-42, 2016

 Enterprise architecture: Twenty years of the GERAM framework

P Bernus, O Noran, A Molina

Annual Reviews in Control 39, 83-93, 2015

 The development of an artificial organic networks toolkit for LabVIEW

H Ponce, P Ponce, A Molina

Journal of computational chemistry 36 (7), 478-492, 2015

 Design S3-RF (Sustainable x Smart x Sensing-Reference Framework) for the future manufacturing enterprise

H Mauricio-Moreno, J Miranda, D Chavarría, M Ramírez-Cadena, ...

IFAC-PapersOnLine 48 (3), 58-63, 2015

 A novel robust liquid level controller for coupled-tanks systems using artificial hydrocarbon networks

H Ponce, P Ponce, H Bastida, A Molina

Expert Systems with Applications 42 (22), 8858-8867, 2015

 Development of an integrated approach to the design of reconfigurable micro/mesoscale CNC machine tools

R Pérez, A Molina, M Ramírez-Cadena

Journal of Manufacturing Science and Engineering 136 (3), 031003, 2014

 Adaptive noise filtering based on artificial hydrocarbon networks: An application to audio signals

H Ponce, P Ponce, A Molina

Expert systems with applications 41 (14), 6512-6523, 2014

 Design for sustainable mass-customization: Design guidelines for sustainable mass-customized products

J Osorio, D Romero, M Betancur, A Molina

Engineering, Technology and Innovation (ICE), 2014 International ICE …

Projects 

 Binational laboratory:

He is the technical manager of project 266632 Binational Laboratory for Intelligent Management of Energy Sustainability and Technological Training financed by the CONACyT-SENER Fund for Energy Sustainability, which integrates research initiatives, postgraduate training, capacitation, development, and evaluation of skills for the energy sector, in which more than 128 people participated, including research professors, doctoral students, postdoctoral researchers, and collaborators from the Tecnológico de Monterrey, the National Institute of Electricity and Clean Energies, the Tecnológico Nacional de México, Culiacán, La Laguna, Toluca campus. The Federal Electricity Commission, Arizona State University, and the University of California at Berkeley also participated in this project. These are the results of the Binational Laboratory project after 4 years: at the postgraduate level, 231 students graduated from the institution's master's and specialties, 20 graduated at the doctoral level, 11 doctoral students collaborated in short projects to support their doctoral training; 12 MOOC courses were developed in which 143,920 people participated, 17,776 obtained a certificate. 10 labor competency standards registered in CONOCER were developed, 11 courses for Competency Evaluators were implemented, and 397 labor competency evaluators were trained, which supported the evaluation and certification of 10,930 employees of the Federal Electricity Commission. Four international research networks were created, with the collaboration of 70 universities, research centers, and national and international government entities. 9 research projects were developed that produced 103 scientific articles, 80 presentations at national and international congresses, 4 applied patents, 4 published books, 28 research stays, and more than 112 specialized research technical reports. Regarding academic infrastructure, 3 decision-making centers were designed and installed, 4 remote laboratories for energy measurement, power control, motors and MOOCs, 4 physical smart grids and a virtual smart grid, 4 reconfigurable micro-factories, 1 experimental pilot plant, 1 integrated laboratory for sustainable energy use, 1 integrated laboratory for the generation of electricity from organic livestock waste, 1 power electronics research laboratory, 1 electrical laboratory, 1 Cyber-Physical Systems laboratory.

 Open Innovation Laboratory:

The Open Innovation Laboratory of the Tecnológico de Monterrey is a space that promotes collaborative and multidisciplinary work for the research, design, and development of new products/services not only with internal participants within the institution but also with participants external, such as other universities, companies, and government. This laboratory promotes the use of specific learning-teaching techniques, design methodologies, and development of products/services to offer solutions with "S3" (sensing, smart and sustainable) characteristics, as well as offering a technological platform that includes physical infrastructure and Virtual for rapid prototyping. Therefore, students are immersed in an ecosystem of open innovation that will allow them to generate experiences and knowledge to develop desirable skills for their professional performance.

 SECTEI:

He is the technical manager of the project "Operation of the Center for the Learning of Technological and Social Entrepreneurship of Mexico City (CAETS -CDMX)" (CM-SECTEI/223/2020) with financing from the Ministry of Education, Science, Technology and Innovation (SECTEI) of the Government of Mexico City. The operation of this center seeks to promote the entrepreneurship ecosystem in CDMX through mentoring programs and innovative teaching-learning programs, it has been possible to promote 6 technology-based and social companies, 24 entrepreneurship projects in traditional commercial sectors, and implemented training courses in human resources, in which around 80 workshop participants, through the citizen attention centers called "PILARES". 2 online courses were created in the MOOC modality, and a mentoring program for academics, researchers, and postgraduate students to promote scientific entrepreneurship. 4 reference books for entrepreneurship were published, and 3 articles indexed in Scopus were also published. He also obtained the international PRO-VE 2020 award, and the Best Paper Award Certificate for the publication "Collaborative Networking to Enable Innovation and Entrepreneurship Through"

References

Academic staff of the Monterrey Institute of Technology and Higher Education
Monterrey Institute of Technology and Higher Education alumni
Living people
Year of birth missing (living people)